Eldin, an alternative transliteration of Ad-Din ("faith", "religion"), is a given name and a surname.

It may refer to:

People 
 Eldin Adilović (born 1986), Bosnian footballer
 Eldin Huseinbegović, Bosnian singer-songwriter
 Eldin Jakupović (born 1984), Bosnian-Swiss footballer
 Eldin Karisik (born 1983), Bosnian-Swedish footballer
 Dzulmi Eldin (born 1960), mayor of Medan, North Sumatra
 Mohammed Eldin (born 1985), Sudanese footballer
 Mohamed Bahaa Eldin (born 1947), Egyptian politician
 Mohamed Hossam Eldin (born 2001), Egyptian footballer
 Peter Eldin (born 1939), British author and magician

Fictional characters
 Eldin the Wanderer, in the Cthulhu Mythos story cycle

See also
 John Clerk of Eldin (1728–1812), a figure in the Scottish Enlightenment, remembered for his writings on naval tactics in the Age of Sail
 John Clerk, Lord Eldin (1757–1832), Scottish judge, eldest son of John Clerk of Eldin
 Elden (disambiguation)
 Eldon (disambiguation)

Bosniak masculine given names
Bosnian masculine given names